The Broxbourne Council election, 1998 was held to elect council members of the Broxbourne Borough Council, the local government authority of the borough of Broxbourne, Hertfordshire, England.

Composition of expiring seats before election

Election results

Results summary 
An election was held in 14 wards on 7 May 1998.

The Conservative party gained 5 council seats at this election taking 3 seats from the Liberal Democrats in Cheshunt Central Ward, Hoddesdon Town Ward and Rosedale Ward and taking 2 seats from the Labour Party in Rye Park Ward and Theobalds Ward.

Since the last Broxbourne Local Government Election in 1996 a by-election had been held in Waltham Cross North Ward that had resulted in a gain for the Conservatives at the expense of Labour. Additionally a Liberal Democrat Councillor had "crossed the floor" of the chamber and had joined the Conservative Group.

This was the last Broxbourne local election fought before new electoral boundaries took effect in 1999.

The boundary changes would necessitate an "all out" election in 1999 when all of the 38 "new" seats would be contested.

Accordingly, all councillors elected in 1998 served a 1-year term of office.

The political balance of the new council following this election was:

Conservative 31 seats
Labour 11 seats

Ward results

References

1998
1998 English local elections
1990s in Hertfordshire